MWHS may refer to:
 Marine Wing Headquarters Squadron, squadrons of the United States Marine Corps; specifically:
 Marine Wing Headquarters Squadron 1
 Marine Wing Headquarters Squadron 2
 Marine Wing Headquarters Squadron 3

Schools 
 Magnolia West High School, Magnolia, Texas, United States
 Maine West High School, Des Plaines, Illinois, United States
 Millard West High School, Omaha, Nebraska, United States
 Millwood High School, Lower Sackville, Nova Scotia, Canada
 Monroe-Woodbury High School, Central Valley, New York, United States
 Mound Westonka High School, Mound, Minnesota, United States
 Mt. Whitney High School, Visalia, California, United States
 Mineral Wells High School, Mineral Wells, Texas, United States